Andrea Dutton, a 2019 MacArthur Fellow, is a Professor of Geology in the Department of Geoscience at the University of Wisconsin–Madison where she studies paleoclimate, sedimentology, carbonate geochemistry, and paleoceonagraphy. Her primary research investigates sea level changes during interglacial periods to predict future sea level rise.

Early life and education 
Andrea Dutton was born in Fairfax, Virginia and spent most of her childhood in Atlanta, Georgia and Westport, Connecticut. Dutton graduated from Staples High School in Westport, Connecticut in 1991. From 1991 to 1995, Dutton attended Amherst College where she studied music and focused on classes that would prepare her for the MCAT. Dutton took her first geology class at Amherst, and was immediately "fell in love" with the geological sciences. This altered the direction of her career towards geology. She graduated from Amherst College in 1995 with a BA in music. Following her time at Amherst, Dutton taught science at Saint Ann's School in Brooklyn Heights, New York City where she taught 3rd, 6th, 10th, 11th and 12th grade science. In 2003, Dutton returned to school and earned an MS and a PhD from the University of Michigan in geology. She continued her training as a postdoctoral scholar for two years at the Australian National University, where she continued on as a research fellow for four years.

Career and research 
Dutton was a professor of Geology at the University of Florida in Gainesville, Florida from 2011 to 2019, and now Dutton is a professor of Geology at the University of Wisconsin–Madison.  She co-led an international group that utilizes the geological record to understand sea level rise from 2013 to 2017. Her professional career began when she taught science at the Saint Ann's School in Brooklyn. Through the variety of age groups that Dutton taught, she learned a lot about public speaking on scientific topics, provoking an attentiveness to scientific communication in her future work. In 2000, Dutton received an M.S. in geology from the University of Michigan and a Ph.D. in Geological Sciences in 2003. For her Ph.D., Dutton researched paleoclimate between the Cretaceous and Eocene periods in the Antarctic Peninsula. Dutton completed a postdoctoral fellowship between the years of 2004 and 2005 at the Research School of Earth Sciences at the Australian National University (ANU) in Canberra, Australia. She then worked as a research fellow from 2006 until 2011 at ANU. During her time at ANU as a research fellow, Dutton worked in collaboration with Kurt Lambeck, a geophysicist, to develop an interdisciplinary approach to reconstructing past sea levels using radiometrically dated fossilized coral.

Dutton specializes in paleoceanography and paleoclimatology. Her most recognized work concentrates on reconstructing past sea level variation to predict future changes. To understand how sea level will fluctuate in the future, Dutton looks at what is preserved in the rock record. Specifically, Dutton utilizes fossilized coral and limestone rocks to understand how past sea level increased during warming climates throughout earth's history. Because corals live in shallow waters, they can advantageously be used to track past sea level positions. By studying an entire reef including the assemblages, algae, and other aspects that inform how the coral grew, Dutton and other researchers can provide a holistic comprehension of sea level. She also uses other sedimentary archives to further analyze geologic changes throughout earth's history. In 2019, Dutton was awarded a Fulbright Scholarship to work with researchers in New Zealand to combine records of past sea level rise with models of Antarctic ice dynamics to better understand the effects of warming temperatures on sea levels.

When assessing sea level fluctuations, Dutton studies the geochemistry, geophysics and biology of each reef. In her research, Dutton uses chemistry techniques to find the age of the coral and combines this information with the elevational changes of the reef through time to understand sea level changes. This research also provides knowledge about how ice sheets melted, which can better inform projections of ice sheet fluctuations with future climatic changes. Dutton primarily focuses on sea level rise from 125,000 years ago, when earth temperatures were similar to today's. She studies sea level rise throughout the world, including Florida, the Seychelles Islands, and Mexico's Yucatán Peninsula. One of her research objectives is to determine when the West Antarctic ice sheet collapsed in the past to help us understand when and how this may occur in the future. The findings of Dutton's work are influential for urban planners as coastal communities struggle to adapt to rising seas.

Awards and honors 

MacArthur Fellow
Fulbright Scholar (2019–20)
Geological Society of America Fellow
Faculty Fellow of the Thompson Earth Institute
 2016 Global Fellow at University of Florida
Rolling Stone Magazine's “25 People Shaping the Future in Tech, Science, Medicine, Activism and More"
2015 Faculty Fellow of the Florida Climate Institute

Public engagement 
Andrea Dutton takes her research outside of just the scientific community to make it applicable for all. Climate communication has been something that Dutton has emphasized since her teaching experiences at the Saint Anne's School in Brooklyn, New York. She has shared her research to the general public through a variety of media forums such as:

TEDxUF: Theme: Transparent (2017)
The New York Times: Gillis, Justin. (2017). The Sea Level Did, in Fact, Rise Faster in the Southeast U.S
 Forecast: Climate Conversations with Michael White
NPR: Greene, David. (2018) U.S. Faces 'Immediate Threat" From Climate Change, Report Says.
The Washington Post: Mooney, Chris (2015). Why the Earth's past has scientists so worried about sea level rise.
The Atlantic: Lieberman, Amy (2016). Preparing for the Inevitable Sea-Level Rise
The Wall Street Journal: Dutton, Andrea. Mann, Michael. (2018) Water is Rising Because It's Getting Warmer

Publications 

 A Dutton, K Lambeck (2012) Ice volume and sea level during the last interglacial (Science).
A Dutton, AE Carlson, AJ Long, GA Milne, PU Clark, R DeConto, BP Horton, S Rahmstorf, ME Raymo (2015) Sea-level rise due to polar ice-sheet mass loss during past warm periods (Science).
A Dutton, BH Wilkinson, JM Welker, GJ Bowen, KC Lohmann (2005) Spatial distribution and seasonal variation in 18O/16O of modern precipitation and river water across the conterminous USA (Hydrological Processes: An International Journal).
F Antonioli, L Ferranti, A Fontana, A Amorosi, A Bondesan, C Braitenberg, A Dutton, G Fontolan, S Furlani, K Lambeck, G Mastronuzzi, C Monaco, G Spada, P Stocchi (2009) Holocene relative sea-level changes and vertical movements along the Italian and Istrian coastlines (Quaternary International).
M Greaves, N Caillon, H Rabaubier, G Bartoli, S Bohaty, I Cacho, L Clarke, M Cooper, C Daunt, M Delaney, P DeMenocal, Andrea Dutton, Stephen Eggins, Henry Elderfield, Dieter Garbe‐Schoenberg, Ethan Goddard, D Green, J Groeneveld, D Hastings, E Hathorne, K Kimoto, Gary Klinkhammer, Laurent Labeyrie, David W Lea, Tom Marchitto, MA Martínez‐Botí, Peter Graham Mortyn, Y Ni, Dirk Nürnberg, G Paradis, L Pena, Terrence Quinn, Y Rosenthal, Ann Russell, T Sagawa, Sindia Sosdian, L Stott, K Tachikawa, E Tappa, R Thunell, PA Wilson (2008) Interlaboratory comparison study of calibration standards for foraminiferal Mg/Ca thermometry (Geochemistry, Geophysics, Geosystems).
A Dutton, KC Lohmann, WJ Zinsmeister (2002) Stable isotope and minor element proxies of Eocene climate and Seymour Island, Antarctica (Paleoceanography).

For a more complete list of Dutton's peer-reviewed publications see her Google Scholar Profile

References 

Year of birth missing (living people)
Living people
American women geologists
University of Michigan College of Literature, Science, and the Arts alumni
MacArthur Fellows
Amherst College alumni
Staples High School alumni
Fellows of the Geological Society of America
Academic staff of the Australian National University
University of Florida faculty
American women academics
21st-century American women